Kenneth Scott Kaplan (born January 12, 1960) is a former American football player.  

He was born in Boston, Massachusetts and played collegiately for New Hampshire. Kaplan was then drafted in the 1983 NFL Draft by the Tampa Bay Buccaneers.  
He played the 1984 and 1985 NFL seasons with the Buccaneers, and the 1987 season with the New Orleans Saints.

References

External links
 NFL Profile
 PFR Profile

Living people
American football tackles
Tampa Bay Buccaneers players
New Orleans Saints players
1960 births
National Football League replacement players